Mesonauta mirificus is a species of cichlid fish native to the western Amazon basin in Peru and Colombia.

References 

mirificus
Freshwater fish of Colombia
Freshwater fish of Peru
Fish of the Amazon basin
Fish described in 1991